For the 1966 Vuelta a España, the field consisted of 90 riders; 55 finished the race.

By rider

By nationality

References

1966 Vuelta a España
1966